Steven Ike Sanders (born December 23, 1982) is a former American football wide receiver. He was signed by the Cleveland Browns as an undrafted free agent in 2006. He played college football at Bowling Green.

Sanders has also been a member of the Detroit Lions, New York Sentinels and Arizona Cardinals.

Early years
Sanders attended East High School in Cleveland, Ohio where he was a star football player for the historic East High School Blue Bombers and graduated from the school's Academy of Finance. On February 2, 2003 his first child Armier Sanders was born.

College career
Sanders played college football at Bowling Green. He finished his college career with 156 receptions for 2,324 yards and 24 touchdowns. He was an integrated mathematics major.

Professional career

Cleveland Browns
Sanders was signed by the Cleveland Browns as an undrafted rookie free agent on May 4, 2006.

Sanders was added to the active roster September 6, 2008 after the team waived rookie wide receiver Paul Hubbard. Sanders was waived on October 6 when the team signed safety Hamza Abdullah. He was re-signed to the team's practice squad on October 8. He was promoted to the Browns' active roster on November 1 after offensive lineman Ryan Tucker was placed on injured reserve.

Detroit Lions
After finishing the 2008 season on the Browns' practice squad, Sanders was signed to a future contract by the Detroit Lions on January 7, 2009. He was waived on May 4.

New York Sentinels
Sanders was drafted by the New York Sentinels of the United Football League in the UFL Premiere Season Draft. He signed with the team on August 5, 2009, but was later released from his contract so he could sign with the Arizona Cardinals.

Arizona Cardinals
Sanders signed with the Arizona Cardinals on August 18, 2009 only to be waived on September 4.

Arena Football League
In March 2010, Sanders was signed by his hometown Cleveland Gladiators of the Arena Football League.

External links
Arizona Cardinals bio
Bowling Green Falcons bio
Cleveland Browns bio
Detroit Lions bio
United Football League bio

1982 births
Living people
Players of American football from Cleveland
American football wide receivers
Bowling Green Falcons football players
Cleveland Browns players
Berlin Thunder players
Detroit Lions players
New York Sentinels players
Arizona Cardinals players
Cleveland Gladiators players